Riverstone Energy Limited is a Guernsey-domiciled, closed-ended company which invests in energy companies and assets worldwide. Established by Riverstone Holdings in 2013, the company's investment manager is Riverstone International Limited, which is majority-owned and controlled by affiliates of Riverstone. Riverstone is an energy and power-focussed private investment firm founded in 2000 by David M. Leuschen and Pierre F. Lapeyre with approximately $41 billion of capital raised. Riverstone conducts buyout and growth capital investments in the E&P, midstream, oilfield services, power and renewable sectors of the energy industry. With offices in New York, London, Houston, Mexico City, Amsterdam and Menlo Park, the firm has committed approximately $43 billion to over 200 investments in North America, Latin America, Europe, Africa, Asia and Australia.

REL was the subject of a £760m initial public offering in October 2013. It is listed on the London Stock Exchange.

In January 2021, REL made two decarbonisation investments in Loanpal, LLC and FreeWire Technologies, Inc. In February 2021, REL announced additional commitments to Decarbonization Plus Acquisition Corporation (NASDAQ: DCRB), via a private placements, and to Decarbonization Plus Acquisition Corporation II (NASDAQ: DCRNU), via an initial public offering.

Corporate Governance
As of December 2020, REL operates with a fully independent board of directors. REL has also committed to a new modified approach to investing, which includes a focus on energy transition and decarbonisation opportunities.

References

Companies established in 2013